Johanna Sofia Elisabeth Persson (born 25 December 1978) is a former Swedish badminton player. Persson started her junior career in Täby Badmintonförening (now Göteborgs BK), and won her first national junior title in 1993 in the U-14 girls' singles, doubles, and mixed doubles event. She won the Swedish National senior title 11 times from 2002 to 2012, 6 in the women's doubles, and 5 in the mixed doubles. She won the bronze medals at the 2004 European Championships in the mixed doubles event partnered with Fredrik Bergström, and also at the 2006 and 2008 European Championship in the women's doubles event with Elin Bergblom. Persson competed in badminton at the 2004 Summer Olympics in the mixed doubles with partner Bergström. They defeated Mike Beres and Jody Patrick of Canada in the first round and Sudket Prapakamol and Saralee Thungthongkam of Thailand in the second.  In the quarterfinals, Persson and Bergström lost to Zhang Jun and Gao Ling of China 15–3, 15–1. After retiring from the international tournament, in 2009, Persson runs a project Girls of Badminton, to encourage and promote females within the Swedish Badminton Association. In 2011, she was awarded as a Person of the Year by the Badminton Europe. Her sister, Sara Persson, also an Olympian who competed at the 2008 Summer Olympics in Beijing, China.

Achievements

European Championships 
Women's doubles

Mixed doubles

IBF Grand Prix 
The World Badminton Grand Prix sanctioned by International Badminton Federation since 1983.

Mixed doubles

BWF International Challenge/Series
Women's doubles

Mixed doubles

 BWF International Challenge tournament
 BWF International Series tournament

References

External links
 
 
 
 

1978 births
Living people
People from Danderyd Municipality
Sportspeople from Stockholm
Swedish female badminton players
Olympic badminton players of Sweden
Badminton players at the 2004 Summer Olympics
21st-century Swedish women